Fatal Contact may refer to one of the following:

 Fatal Contact: Bird Flu in America, a 2006 ABC television film
 Fatal Contact (film), a 2006 Hong Kong film starring Wu Jing